Young Lust is a 1984 American comedy film directed by Gary Weis and starring Fran Drescher and Mews Small. It was co-financed by Paramount.

It was an early script by Bruce Wagner and was never theatrically released. It was a spoof of soap operas.

Cast
Fran Drescher
Mews Small as Connie
Dana Carvey 
Dorothy Constantine as Elaine Bimster
Edith Fields
Lucy Lee Flippin
Terry Kiser 		
Howard Mann 		
Dean R. Miller 		
Alley Mills 		
John Roarke 		
Michael W. Schwartz
Lyman Ward 		
George Wendt
Mary Woronov

Production
The film was part of a slate of projects that Paramount rushed into production. In April 1982 the film was tentatively meant to come out in May. In June 1982 Paramount said they had no plans to release it.

A May 1983 article said the film "was such a mess that it has yet to be officially delivered to Paramount."

Bruce Wagner later said "I think the director was having some problems at the time with the studio and it was never released. It was a protracted death because a year was spent editing it." Wagner says after a year he was approached to work on the movie for reshoots. "That was also the year where a lot of movies like Young Doctors in Love and raucous comedies like National Lampoon’s Vacation [were released] and this movie...  was very transgressive. The fact that it was not made informed a lot of my future work in writing about failure and shame. I certainly would have written about those things anyway, but in terms of my Hollywood experience, my entrée was one of defeat rather than of triumph."

Legacy
Wagner said "That experience formed a template of failure and humiliation that has been a mother lode for me. Those were aspects of career not personal anguish that I drew from."

References

External links
Young Lust at IMDb

1984 films
Films directed by Gary Weis
1984 comedy films
1980s English-language films